Holmes and Watson may refer to:

Film
 Holmes & Watson. Madrid Days, a 2012 Spanish thriller film
 Holmes & Watson, a 2018 American mystery buddy comedy film

See also
 Sherlock Holmes and Doctor Watson (disambiguation)